The 1828 United States presidential election in Louisiana took place between October 31 and December 2, 1828, as part of the 1828 United States presidential election. Voters chose five representatives, or electors to the Electoral College, who voted for President and Vice President.

Louisiana voted for the Democratic candidate, Andrew Jackson, over the National Republican candidate, John Quincy Adams. Jackson won Louisiana by a margin of 6.02%.

In January 1828, Jackson had visited New Orleans to celebrate the 13th anniversary of the Battle of New Orleans in response to an invitation from the Louisiana legislature; he and his supporters financed the visit, as the legislature rejected providing any money, and lingering anger against Jackson's conduct in 1815 prompted the legislature to disclaim any adherence to Jackson as a political candidate.  The legislature remained dominated by Adams supporters.  His supporters had a mixed record in the fall elections, winning the governor's mansion and the legislature but losing two seats in the federal House of Representatives.  And while the presidential election ultimately saw Adams defeated in Louisiana, it was a slim defeat, in contrast to nearly unanimous support for Jackson throughout the other southern states.

Results

See also
 United States presidential elections in Louisiana

References

Louisiana
1828
1828 Louisiana elections